Denis Papin FRS (22 August 1647 – 26 August 1713) was a French physicist, mathematician and inventor, best known for his pioneering invention of the steam digester, the forerunner of the pressure cooker and of the steam engine.

Early life and education
Born in Chitenay (Loir-et-Cher, Centre-Val de Loire Région), Papin attended a Jesuit school there. In 1661, he attended the University of Angers, from which he graduated with a medical degree in 1669.

Career
In 1673, Papin worked with Christiaan Huygens and Gottfried Leibniz in Paris, and became interested in using a vacuum to generate motive power.

In 1675, he first visited London, where he worked with Robert Boyle from 1676 to 1679, publishing an account of his work in Continuation of New Experiments (1680). During this period, Papin invented the steam digester, a type of pressure cooker with a safety valve. He first addressed the Royal Society in 1679 on the subject of his digester, and remained mostly in London. As a Huguenot, Papin found himself greatly affected by the increasing restrictions placed on Protestants by Louis XIV of France and by the King's ultimate revocation of the Edict of Nantes in 1685.

In Germany, he was able to live with fellow Huguenot exiles from France, so in about 1687, he left to take up an academic post in Germany.

In 1689, Papin suggested that a force pump or bellows could maintain the pressure and fresh air inside a diving bell. (Engineer John Smeaton utilised this design in 1789.)

While in Marburg in 1690, having observed the mechanical power of atmospheric pressure on his 'digester', Papin built a model of a piston steam engine, the first of its kind.  In 1705 while teaching mathematics at the University of Marburg, he developed a second steam engine with the help of Gottfried Leibniz, based on an invention by Thomas Savery, but this used steam pressure rather than atmospheric pressure.  Details of the engine were published in 1707.

In 1705, Papin constructed a ship powered by hand-cranked paddles. An apocryphal story originating in 1851 by Louis Figuire held that this ship was steam-powered rather than hand-powered and that it was therefore the first steam-powered vehicle of any kind. The myth was refuted as early as 1880 by Ernst Gerland, though still it finds credulous expression in some contemporary scholarly work.

Later, at the iron foundry in Veckerhagen (now Reinhardshagen), he cast the world's first steam cylinder.

In 1707, Papin returned to London leaving his wife in Germany. Several of his papers were put before the Royal Society between 1707 and 1712 without acknowledging or paying him, about which he complained bitterly. Papin's ideas included a description of his 1690 atmospheric steam engine, similar to that built and put into use by Thomas Newcomen in 1712, thought to be the year of Papin's death.

Death
The last surviving evidence of Papin's whereabouts came in a letter he wrote dated 23 January 1712. At the time he was destitute ("I am in a sad case") [Royal Society Archives, 1894, Vol. 7, 74], and it was believed that he died that year and was buried in an unmarked grave in London.

However, a record exists for the burial of a “Denys Papin” in an 18th-century Register of Marriages & Burials which originally came from St Bride's Church, Fleet Street, London, but which is stored in the London Metropolitan Archives. The record states that Denys Papin was buried at St Bride's on 26 August 1713 – just a few days after his 66th birthday – and that he was buried in the Lower Ground, one of the two burial areas belonging to the church at the time. Since the discovery, in 2016, of the place and date of Papin's burial in 1713, a memorial plaque has been erected in the West Entrance of St Bride's Church, Fleet Street, London, to commemorate his life and his achievements.

Legacy
Boulevard Denis Papin in Carcassonne is named after him as well as a street in Saint-Michel, Montreal. There is also a statue of Papin with his invention in Blois, at the top of the Escalier Denis Papin, a stairway.

Works

References

Sources

External links

 
 

1647 births
1710s deaths
People from Loir-et-Cher
17th-century French inventors
French Protestants
Members of the French Academy of Sciences
Fellows of the Royal Society
Huguenots
Year of death unknown